The 2005 Canadian Figure Skating Championships took place from January 17 through 23rd, 2005 at the John Labatt Centre in London, Ontario. It is a figure skating national championship held annually to determine the national champions of Canada and is organized by Skate Canada, the nation's figure skating governing body. Skaters competed at the senior and junior levels in the disciplines of men's singles, women's singles, pair skating, and ice dancing. Although the official ISU terminology for female skaters in the singles category is ladies, Skate Canada's official terminology is women and that is the term used in the official results. Due to the number of entries, the men's and women's competition had a qualifying round and the qualifying round was split in half to accommodate all the skaters. The results of this competition were used to pick the Canadian teams to the 2005 World Championships, the 2005 Four Continents Championships, and the 2005 World Junior Championships.

Senior results

men

Women

Pairs

Ice dancing

Junior results

Men

Women

Pairs

Ice dancing

External links
 2005 BMO Financial Group Canadian Championships 

Canadian Figure Skating Championships
Canadian Figure Skating Championships
Figure Skating Championships
Canadian Figure Skating Championships
Canadian Figure Skating Championships